Nentershausen may refer to:

 Nentershausen, Hesse
 Nentershausen, Rhineland-Palatinate